Abraham Núñez (born February 5, 1977) is a Dominican former Major League Baseball outfielder. He has played in MLB for the Florida Marlins (2002, 2004) and Kansas City Royals (2004). He is a switch-hitter and throws right-handed. Nunez played for the Washington Nationals Triple-A affiliate Columbus Clippers in 2007. In 2008, he played for the CPBL's Chinatrust Whales.

In two major league seasons, Núñez was a .209 hitter with six home runs and 35 RBI in 136 games played.

In 2006, while playing with the minor league Fresno Grizzlies, Núñez was suspended 50 games for testing positive for use of a performance-enhancing substance.  He last played for the Caffè Danesi Nettuno of Italy's Serie A1 in 2009.

External links

1977 births
Albuquerque Isotopes players
Arizona League Diamondbacks players
Arizona League Giants players
Baseball players suspended for drug offenses
Brevard County Manatees players
Calgary Cannons players
Chinatrust Whales players
Columbus Clippers players
Dominican Republic expatriate baseball players in Canada
Dominican Republic expatriate baseball players in Italy
Dominican Republic expatriate baseball players in Taiwan
Dominican Republic expatriate baseball players in the United States
Dominican Republic sportspeople in doping cases
Florida Marlins players
Fresno Grizzlies players
High Desert Mavericks players
Jupiter Hammerheads players
Kansas City Royals players

Living people
Major League Baseball outfielders
Major League Baseball players from the Dominican Republic
Nettuno Baseball Club players
Portland Sea Dogs players
South Bend Silver Hawks players
Tacoma Rainiers players